Frozen II, also written as Frozen 2, is a 2019 American computer-animated musical fantasy film produced by Walt Disney Animation Studios as their 58th film and the sequel to Frozen (2013). It was directed by Chris Buck and Jennifer Lee, and written by Lee, Buck, Marc Smith, Kristen Anderson-Lopez, and Robert Lopez. Produced by Peter Del Vecho, the film stars the voices of Kristen Bell, Idina Menzel, Josh Gad, and Jonathan Groff. Set three years after the first film, Frozen II follows sisters Anna and Elsa, Kristoff, his reindeer Sven, and the snowman Olaf as they travel to an enchanted forest to unravel the origin of Elsa's magical power.

Frozen II premiered in Los Angeles on November 7, 2019, and was released on November 22. Made on a production budget of $150million, it earned $1.45billion worldwide, finishing its theatrical run as the third-highest-grossing film of 2019, the tenth-highest-grossing film of all time, and the second-highest-grossing animated film of all time. On the review aggregator website Rotten Tomatoes, the film holds an approval rating of  based on  reviews.

Frozen II and its soundtrack have received various awards and nominations. It garnered two Golden Globe nominations at the 77th ceremony. The film won two of eight nominations at the 47th Annie Awards. At the 92nd Academy Awards, Frozen II received a Best Original Song nomination (for "Into the Unknown").

Accolades

See also
 List of accolades received by Frozen (2013 film)

Notes

References

External links
 

Disney-related lists
Frozen (franchise)
Lists of accolades by film